BCMP may stand for
 A BCMP network of queues, studied by Baskett, Chandy, Muntz, Palacios 
 The British Columbia Marijuana Party